The 1966–67 Allsvenskan was the 33rd season of the top division of Swedish handball. 10 teams competed in the league. Vikingarnas IF won the league and claimed their second Swedish title. IK Tord and Göteborgs IK were relegated.

League table

References 

Swedish handball competitions